Sminthurinus quadrimaculatus is a species of globular springtail in the family Katiannidae.

Subspecies
These two subspecies belong to the species Sminthurinus quadrimaculatus:
 Sminthurinus quadrimaculatus bimaculatus Maynard
 Sminthurinus quadrimaculatus quadrimaculatus

References

External links

Collembola
Articles created by Qbugbot
Animals described in 1879